Emilie Beneš Brzezinski (born Emilie Anna Beneš; January 21, 1932 – July 22, 2022) was a Swiss-American sculptor and the wife of Zbigniew Brzezinski.

Education and career
Emilie Beneš was born in Geneva, Switzerland. She earned a fine arts degree at Wellesley College in Massachusetts, United States.  After marrying, she sculpted for 25 years while raising a family, then had her first solo show in 1981 in Washington, D.C.

From the 1980s on, most of her works have been in wood. Her monumental 1993 work Lintel, constructed from cut cherry trees and then cast in bronze, is in the collection of Grounds for Sculpture, a  sculpture park and museum in New Jersey. She exhibited in the 2003 Florence Biennale and participated by invitation in the 2005 Vancouver International Sculpture Biennale. The Kreeger Museum had an exhibition of her work in 2014.

Personal life
Václav Edvard Beneš, a mathematician, was her brother. Shortly after graduating from Wellesley, Emilie Beneš, herself a relative of Czechoslovakia's former president Edvard Beneš, married Polish-born emigrant turned naturalized citizen Zbigniew Brzezinski, a political scientist who served as an adviser to President Carter. The Brzezinskis have three children.  Their oldest son, Ian Brzezinski, served as Deputy Assistant Secretary of Defense for Europe and NATO Policy in 2001–2005. Their second son, Mark Brzezinski, is the current U.S. Ambassador to Poland. Their youngest child, Mika Brzezinski, is a co-host for MSNBC.

Emilie Benes Brzezinski died on July 22, 2022, at the age of 90.

References

External links
Museum Kampa in Prague
Vancouver Sculpture Biennale
Grounds for Sculpture: Collection
Official website

1932 births
2022 deaths
Wellesley College alumni
Artists from Geneva
Swiss emigrants to the United States
American people of Czech descent
Emilie Benes
United States Assistant Secretaries of Defense
20th-century American sculptors
21st-century American sculptors
20th-century American women artists
21st-century American women artists